Parliamentary elections were held in Kosovo on 14 February 2021. The results were a landslide victory for Vetëvendosje led by Albin Kurti and its coalition partner, Vjosa Osmani, former speaker of the parliament of Kosovo. The alliance won more than 50% of the total votes, the highest share since the first elections held in 2001, while their nearest rivals, the Democratic Party, finished in second place, trailing by more than 33%.

Background
The October 2019 parliamentary elections saw opposition party Vetëvendosje emerge as the largest faction in parliament, finishing just ahead of the Democratic League of Kosovo (LDK). The two parties formed a new government on 3 February 2020, with Vetëvendosje leader Albin Kurti as the Prime Minister. Kurti was elected Prime Minister with 66 votes and ten abstentions. The 34 opposition MPs boycotted the vote and left the Assembly building. The coalition soon collapsed as the LDK filed a no-confidence motion on 25 March 2020 due to disagreements over how to handle the coronavirus pandemic. The motion passed, with 82 members of the Assembly voting in favor, the first time a Kosovan government had fallen in such a manner. The Kurti cabinet continued in office as a caretaker government, while the LDK leader Avdullah Hoti attempted to form a government. Although Hoti's eligibility to be Prime Minister had been questioned by Kurti and Vetëvendosje, who claimed that a government could not be formed without the party that won the most seats in the previous elections, on 28 May the Constitutional Court confirmed the LDK had the right to form a government without fresh elections. The Court ruled that after the party that won the elections failed again to form a new government, another party was able to, and Hoti could be approved as Prime Minister in a parliamentary vote.

On 3 June Hoti was elected Prime Minister by a vote of 61–24, with one abstention. However, on 21 December the Constitutional Court ruled that the vote of Etem Arifi of the minority Ashkali Party for Integration in favour of Hoti was invalid (as Arifi had been convicted of fraud) and consequently the government had not received the support of the majority of the Assembly. As a result, fresh elections were called, with the Hoti government continuing as a caretaker government.

Electoral system
The 120 members of the Assembly of Kosovo are elected by open list proportional representation, with 20 seats reserved for national minorities. An electoral threshold of 5% is in place for non-minority parties. Seats are allocated using the Webster/Sainte-Laguë method. To form a government, a party or coalition must have a majority of 61 MPs out of 120 seats in the Assembly of Kosovo.

Parties and coalitions
The Election Commission published the official list of the 28 participating parties and coalitions.

Opinion polls

Results 
Vetëvendosje won the most votes that any party has won in any Kosovan election since independence. The previous vote share record was held by Ibrahim Rugova's victory in 2001 with 359,851 votes. The 2021 election saw a record number of non-resident citizens who participated in the election via postal voting. In comparison to 35,087 in the 2019 election, 102,100 non-resident citizens gained the right to vote via postal voting in the 2021 election. The counting of the locally cast ballots was completed within a week, while the diaspora vote count was finished on by 3 March.

In the initial results, two newly created minorities parties that had been backed by the Serb List (Romani Initiative and United Community) won two and one seat, respectively. However, the parties faced accusations of strategic voting organised by the Serb List in order gain control of seats outside the ten reserved for Serbs. More than 200 complaints to the Election Panel triggered an investigation that discovered many irregularities, including a suspicious 49% increase in the Bosnian minority vote compared to the 2019 elections, with a large share of those votes having been cast in Serb-dominated areas rather than in their own communities. This led the panel to remove hundreds of votes cast, which caused the loss of one of the two seats won by the Romani Initiative and the single seat won by United Community, a decision confirmed by the Supreme Court. The final result was certified by the Central Election Commission (KQZ) on 13 March.

Reactions
Albin Kurti, leader of the winning party, Vetëvendosje, called the results a vindication of his campaign claim that the election was a "referendum" on what he called a "seizure of the state" during the no-confidence vote held in 2020. All parties which are likely to stand in the opposition were part of the LDK-led governing coalition. They all accepted the results and congratulated Vetëvendosje.

Albanian prime minister Edi Rama and main opposition leader Lulzim Basha both congratulated Kurti. Ali Ahmeti, leader of DUI, the main ethnic Albanian party in North Macedonia, congratulated Vetëvendosje and pledged that his party would be a "brother, ally and supporter… as well as partner and cooperator". Shaip Kamberi, an ethnic Albanian MP in the parliament of Serbia, hailed the electoral process and the election results, which according to Kamberi showed "both democratic capacities and functional institutions".

In light of the disappointing results for LDK, party leader Isa Mustafa announced that he would resign.

On 4 April Vjosa Osmani was elected as the second female president of Kosovo by the Assembly.

Notes

References

Kosovo
Elections in Kosovo
P